Johan Stig Mikael Lindbom (born July 8, 1971) is a former Swedish professional ice hockey player who played 38 games in the National Hockey League (NHL) with the New York Rangers.

Career statistics

External links
 

1971 births
Living people
Hartford Wolf Pack players
HV71 players
IF Troja/Ljungby players
New York Rangers draft picks
New York Rangers players
People from Alvesta Municipality
Swedish ice hockey right wingers
Sportspeople from Kronoberg County
HV71 coaches
Swedish Hockey League coaches